The Nesomyidae are a family of African rodents in the large and complex superfamily Muroidea.  It includes several subfamilies, all of which are native to either continental Africa or to Madagascar. Included in this family are Malagasy rodents, climbing mice, African rock mice, swamp mice, pouched rats, and the white-tailed rat.

Characteristics

Nesomyids are small- to medium-sized rodents, with the largest being the size of a rat. Physically, they may resemble mice, rats, voles, or hamsters, depending on the species and subfamily. Their diets vary from fairly strict herbivory to nearly pure insectivory. Their habits are similarly variable, with some species climbing trees, and others burrowing in the ground. They give birth to up to four young after a gestation period around six weeks.

Classification

Many of these animals were once thought to be related to other groups of muroid rodents, but this African-based clade has been proposed and confirmed on the basis of genetic studies.  Such alternate arrangement include the pouched rats in the family Muridae, and the white-tailed rat in the family Cricetidae.  Likewise, all members of the Nesomyidae are often placed in the family Muridae along with all other members of the Muroidea.

Nesomyids are classified in six subfamilies, 21 genera, and 68 species.

FAMILY NESOMYIDAE
Subfamily Cricetomyinae - pouched rats
Genus Beamys
Lesser hamster-rat, Beamys hindei
Greater hamster-rat, Beamys major
Genus Cricetomys - giant pouched rats
Southern giant pouched rat, Cricetomys ansorgei
Gambian pouched rat, Cricetomys gambianus
Emin's pouched rat, Cricetomys emini
Kivu giant pouched rat, Cricetomys kivuensis
Genus Saccostomus - pouched mice
South African pouched mouse, Saccostomus campestris
Mearns's pouched mouse, Saccostomus mearnsi
Subfamily Delanymyinae
Genus Delanymys
Delany's mouse, Delanymys brooksi
Subfamily Dendromurinae 
Genus Dendromus - climbing mice
Remarkable climbing mouse, Dendromus insignis
Mount Kahuzi climbing mouse, Dendromus kahuziensis
Monard's African climbing mouse, Dendromus leucostomus
Lovat's climbing mouse, Dendromus lovati
Gray climbing mouse, Dendromus melanotis
Brants's climbing mouse, Dendromus mesomelas
Banana climbing mouse, Dendromus messorius
Chestnut climbing mouse, Dendromus mystacalis
Kivu climbing mouse, Dendromus nyasae (kivu)
Nyika climbing mouse, Dendromus nyikae
Cameroon climbing mouse, Dendromus oreas
Dendromus ruppi
Vernay's climbing mouse, Dendromus vernayi
Genus Megadendromus
Nikolaus's mouse, Megadendromus nikolausi
Genus Dendroprionomys
Velvet climbing mouse, Dendroprionomys rousseloti
Genus Prionomys
Dollman's climbing mouse, Prionomys batesi
Genus Malacothrix
Gerbil mouse, Malacothrix typica
Genus Steatomys - fat mice
Bocage's African fat mouse, Steatomys bocagei
Northwestern fat mouse, Steatomys caurinus
Dainty fat mouse, Steatomys cuppedius
Jackson's fat mouse, Steatomys jacksoni
Kreb's fat mouse, Steatomys krebsii
Pousargues's African fat mouse, Steatomys opimus
Tiny fat mouse, Steatomys parvus
Fat mouse, Steatomys pratensis
Subfamily Mystromyinae
Genus Mystromys
White-tailed rat, Mystromys albicaudatus
Subfamily Nesomyinae - Malagasy rodents
Genus Brachytarsomys - Malagasy white-tailed rats
White-tailed antsangy, Brachytarsomys albicauda
Hairy-tailed antsangy, Brachytarsomys villosa
Genus Brachyuromys - Malagasy short-tailed rats
Betsileo short-tailed rat, Brachyuromys betsileoensis
Gregarious short-tailed rat, Brachyuromys ramirohitra
Genus Eliurus - tufted-tailed rats
Tsingy tufted-tailed rat, Eliurus antsingy
Ankarana Special Reserve tufted-tailed rat, Eliurus carletoni
Ellerman's tufted-tailed rat, Eliurus ellermani
Daniel's tufted-tailed rat, Eliurus danieli
Grandidier's tufted-tailed rat, Eliurus grandidieri
Major's tufted-tailed rat, Eliurus majori
Lesser tufted-tailed rat, Eliurus minor
Dormouse tufted-tailed rat, Eliurus myoxinus
White-tipped tufted-tailed rat, Eliurus penicillatus
Petter's tufted-tailed rat, Eliurus petteri
Tanala tufted-tailed rat, Eliurus tanala
Webb's tufted-tailed rat, Eliurus webbi
Genus Gymnuromys
Voalavoanala, Gymnuromys roberti
Genus Hypogeomys
Votsovotsa (Malagasy giant rat), Hypogeomys antimena
Genus Macrotarsomys - big-footed mice
Bastard big-footed mouse, Macrotarsomys bastardi
Greater big-footed mouse, Macrotarsomys ingens
Petter's big-footed mouse, Macrotarsomys petteri
Genus Monticolomys
Malagasy mountain mouse, Monticolomys koopmani
Genus Nesomys
White-bellied nesomys, Nesomys audeberti
Western nesomys, Nesomys lambertoni
Island mouse, Nesomys rufus
Genus Voalavo
Eastern voalavo, Voalavo antsahabensis
Northern voalavo, Voalavo gymnocaudus
Subfamily Petromyscinae - African rock mice
Genus Petromyscus
Barbour's rock mouse, Petromyscus barbouri
Pygmy rock mouse, Petromyscus collinus
Brukkaros pygmy rock mouse, Petromyscus monticularis
Shortridge's rock mouse, Petromyscus shortridgei

References

 
 
 

 
Rodent families
 
Extant Miocene first appearances
Taxa named by Charles Immanuel Forsyth Major